The Hamburg University of Technology (in German Technische Universität Hamburg, abbreviated TUHH (HH as acronym of Hamburg state) or TU Hamburg) is a research university in Germany. The university was founded in 1978 and in 1982/83 lecturing followed. Around 100 senior lecturers/professors and 1,475 members of staff (639 scientists, including externally funded researchers) work at the TUHH.

It is located in Harburg, a district in the south of Hamburg.

Interdisciplinary Studies

Instead of traditional faculties, the TUHH has separate administrations for teaching and for research: research is conducted in departments, teaching is divided into schools of study. Scientists from different subjects work together in the departments. Curricula are organized by academic speciality, depending on the course of study followed.

In the year 2000, the TUHH defined the following strategic topics of research activities:

 Information as economic value
 Organization for enterprises
 Production and process integrated environmental protection
 Sustainable management of resources
 Advanced energy systems and energy management
 Sustainable urban structures
 Systems of transport and logistic
 Advanced information and communication technologies
 Advanced materials and microsystems
 Biotechnologies and biomedical engineering

Research is divided into six interdisciplinary research departments:

 Town, Environment, Technology
 Systems Engineering
 Civil Engineering and Marine Technology
 Information and Communication Technology
 Materials, Design, Manufacturing
 Processing Technology and Energy Systems

Teaching is organized in eight schools of study:
 Civil Engineering
 Electrical Engineering, Computer Science and Mathematics
 Vocational Subject Education
 Management Science and Technology
 Mechanical Engineering
 Process and Chemical Engineering
 General Engineering Sciences
 Naval Architecture

The TUHH belongs to top 600 universities in the world according to Times Higher Education rankings. Their place is 92nd in terms of Young University Rankings 2020.

Northern Institute of Technology Management 

The Northern Institute of Technology (NIT) Management is a private educational institute located on the campus of the Hamburg University of Technology (TUHH) in Hamburg, Germany. It was founded in 1998 as a public-private partnership of the Hamburg University of Technology and sponsoring companies.

The NIT offers a double degree master´s program in technology management in cooperation with the Hamburg University of Technology (TUHH): Students study a Master of Science in an engineering or science program at the TUHH while studying in the MBA program at the NIT—which is also offered part-time for working professionals. Students will graduate from the NIT with an MBA or Master of Technology Management degree after completion of the courses. Besides the classical management disciplines, the MBA program includes modules from areas of classical management, self-development, innovation management, company foundation, and digitalization to familiarize students with the entrepreneurial challenges of the future: All classes are held in the English language. The faculty consists of professors and industry experts from various universities and international companies. The management program offered by the NIT is accredited by the Foundation for International Business Administration Accreditation (FIBAA). After the NIT developed the content and structure of its Master's program in Technology Management in 2019, the FIBAA reaccredited the program and it may continue to bear their seal of approval.

Innovation 

TUHH founded the TUHH Technologie GmbH (TuTech). Since 1992 the TuTech has been responsible for technology transfer and advice, for trade fairs and further training, as well as congresses and the initiation of projects. Examples are the "Starterzentrum", the local initiation "hep", the "Gründerrat" of the TUHH as well as a course of studies for carriermanagement. Young entrepreneurs are accompanied and advised on setting up their own business. In 1994 the TUHH became a pioneer German university in the creation of modular courses and introduced a course with a bachelor's degree in General Engineering Science. Since 1997 nine master's degree courses and a bachelor's degree course have been added.

University Library

The library is not only used internally but as a specialized technical library of the Hamburg region. Its services are also available to citizens who are not students.

In addition to the basic service of providing printed media on loan or for use within the TUB HH, the library also procures documents from cooperation partners such as libraries, specialized information centres and publishers.

The most important book is 'Hoischen: Technisches Zeichnen: Grundlagen, Normen, Beispiele, Darstellende Geometrie.'.

References

External links

TUHH website

Educational institutions established in 1978
Technical University of Hamburg
Buildings and structures in Harburg, Hamburg
Business schools in Germany
Management science
1978 establishments in West Germany
Universities and colleges in Hamburg